Aiden Tolman (born 10 November 1988) is a former Australian professional rugby league footballer who last played as a  for the Cronulla-Sutherland Sharks in the NRL.

He previously played for the Melbourne Storm and the Canterbury-Bankstown Bulldogs in the National Rugby League, and played at representative level for NSW Country.

Early life
Tolman was born in Kempsey, New South Wales, Australia.

He was educated at St Paul's College, Kempsey and represented 2006 Australian Schoolboys. He has also played for the Junior Kangaroos.

Tolman played his junior football with the Smithtown Tigers and he has also played for the Central Coast Storm and the Queensland Cup side, Norths Devils.

Playing career

2008
Tolman made his first-grade debut for Melbourne Storm against the Canberra Raiders in round 6 of the 2008 season.
He has been compared to former Melbourne Storm player Robbie Kearns. In 2008 he was named the Melbourne Storm rookie of the year.

2009
He played in the 2009 premiership against Parramatta. This premiership was later stripped in 2010 by the NRL due to the club's multiple and deliberate breaches of the salary cap between 2006-2010.

2011
On 18 May 2010, he signed for the Canterbury-Bankstown Bulldogs for three years.

In round one of the 2011 National Rugby League season Tolman made his debut for the Canterbury-Bankstown Bulldogs against the West Tigers at ANZ Stadium. Tolman finished the season with 21 appearances and six tries.

2012
In 2012, Tolman ended the season with 27 appearances and 3 tries. He achieved the coach's award for the club.  Tolman played for Canterbury in the 2012 NRL Grand Final loss against his former club Melbourne at ANZ Stadium.

2013
The Canterbury-Bankstown Bulldogs re-signed Tolman for a further four years, through until the end of season 2017. For the second year in a row, Tolman once again received the coach's award from coach Des Hasler. Tolman finished the season with 25 appearances and a try.

2014
Tolman played in Canterbury's 2014 NRL Grand Final loss against the South Sydney Rabbitohs. Tolman finished the season with 22 appearances and a try.

2015
Tolman played 21 games for Canterbury in the 2015 NRL season as the club qualified for the finals. Tolman played in both of Canterbury's finals matches as the club reached the second week but were eliminated by the Sydney Roosters.

2016
On 6 December 2016, Tolman re-signed with Canterbury which would see him at the club until 2020.

2017
On 27 May 2017, Tolman made 51 tackles, 17 hit ups for 148 running meters, and played 80 minutes, in round 12 against the Cronulla-Sutherland Sharks. Tolman made a total of 24 appearances for Canterbury-Bankstown in the 2017 NRL season as they failed to reach the finals for the first time since 2011.

2018
In 2018, Tolman made 16 appearances for Canterbury as the club endured one of its toughest seasons on the field. At one stage of the season, Canterbury were sitting second last on the table but rallied to achieve upset victories over the Brisbane Broncos, New Zealand Warriors and St George to finish the season in 12th place.

2019
In round 15, Tolman made his 250th first grade appearance against Cronulla-Sutherland at ANZ Stadium which ended in a 14-12 victory to Canterbury-Bankstown.

In round 20 against the Penrith Panthers, Tolman played his 200th game for Canterbury - just the 12th Canterbury player to do so - and achieved in inside of nine seasons.

Tolman made a total of 23 appearances for Canterbury in the 2019 NRL season as the club finished 12th on the table. At one stage, Canterbury-Bankstown found themselves sitting last on the table and in real danger of finishing with the wooden spoon. However, for the third straight season, Canterbury achieved four upset victories in a row over Penrith, the Wests Tigers, South Sydney and Parramatta who were all competing for a place in the finals series and were higher on the table. Pay was credited with the late season revival as the side focused heavily on defense.

2020
In 2020, Tolman made 17 appearances for Canterbury as the club again endured one of its toughest seasons on the field. On September 22, Tolman was told by Canterbury that his services would not be required in 2021 and that he would be released by the club. Tolman was one of eight players who were told they would be released as Canterbury looked to rebuild after a horror year on and off the field.

In November 2020, Tolman signed a deal to join Cronulla-Sutherland for the 2021 season.

2021
In round 1 of the 2021 NRL season, Tolman made his club debut for the Cronulla-Sutherland Sharks in their 32-18 victory over the St. George Illawarra Dragons. Tolman played 45 minutes off the bench, running for 134 meters.

In round 16, Tolman scored his first try for Cronulla-Sutherland during a 26-18 upset loss to the Brisbane Broncos.
Tolman played 21 games for Cronulla in the 2021 NRL season which saw the club narrowly miss the finals by finishing 9th on the table.

2022
In round 4 of the 2022 NRL season, Tolman played his 300th first grade game for Cronulla in an 18-0 victory over the Newcastle Knights. Tolman scored the first try of the match.
On 25 August, Tolman announced he was retiring at the end of the season.

Statistics

NRL

City vs Country

References

External links

Canterbury Bulldogs profile
Bulldogs profile 
Melbourne Storm profile

1988 births
Living people
Australian rugby league players
Cronulla-Sutherland Sharks players
Canterbury-Bankstown Bulldogs players
Melbourne Storm players
Country New South Wales Origin rugby league team players
Junior Kangaroos players
Norths Devils players
Rugby league props
People from the Mid North Coast
Rugby league players from New South Wales